is a Japanese mathematician and professor at the Osaka University of Economics, where he teaches mathematics and information. He is known as the "boomerang professor". He has written nine books about the mathematics in daily life. The most recent one, The mystery of five in nature, investigates, amongst other things, why many flowers have five petals.

Biography 
 1967-1971: Faculty of Mathematics, Department of Science, Kyoto University
 1971-1985: IBM Japan as a Systems Engineer
 1985: Lecturer of Information Mathematics at Osaka University of Economics
 1995–present: Professor at Osaka University of Economics
 2005-2006: Visiting fellow at University of Cambridge, UK, joined for MMP.

Books
 50 Visions of Mathematics, Oxford University Press, May 2014, 
 The Mysterious Number 6174: One of 30 Mathematical Topics in Daily Life, Gendai Sugakusha, July 2013,

Papers
 General Solution for Multiple Foldings of Hexaflexagons IJPAM, Vol. 58, No. 1, (2010).  113-124. "19 faces of Flexagons"
 Fixed Points in Similarity Transformations IJPAM, Vol. 56, No. 3, (2009).  429-438.

Articles for Plus Magazine 
 A bright idea, Plus Magazine, issue 36, University of Cambridge, September 2005.
 Mysterious Number 6174, Plus Magazine, issue 38, University of Cambridge, March 2006.
 Winning Odds, with Steve Humble, Plus Magazine, issue 55, University of Cambridge, June 2010.
 Having fun with unit fractions, Plus Magazine, University of Cambridge, Feb 2012.
 Circles rolling on circles, Plus Magazine, University of Cambridge, May 2014.

References

External links 
 Homepage of Yutaka Nishiyama

1948 births
20th-century Japanese mathematicians
21st-century Japanese mathematicians
Kyoto University alumni
Living people